The Red River is a  river of Minnesota and Wisconsin flowing to the St. Louis River southwest of Duluth and Superior near Oliver, Wisconsin.

See also
List of rivers of Minnesota
List of rivers of Wisconsin

References

Minnesota Watersheds

USGS Hydrologic Unit Map - State of Minnesota (1974)

Rivers of Minnesota
Rivers of Wisconsin
Rivers of St. Louis County, Minnesota